Mangan is an Irish surname anglicised from the Gaelic Ó Mongáin ‘descendant of Mongan’, originally a byname for someone with a luxuriant head of hair (from mongach ‘hair’, ‘mane’).

Notable people include:

 Alan Mangan, Irish Gaelic footballer
 Albert Mangan (1915–1993), American Olympic racewalker
 Andrew Mangan (writer), creator of Arsenal blog, Arseblog
 Andy Mangan (born 1986), English footballer
 Colm Mangan, Irish General
 Cyrille Mangan (born 1976), Cameroonian footballer
 Dan Mangan (born 1983), Canadian musician
 Jim Mangan (1929–2007), American baseball player
 Jack Mangan (1927–2013), Irish Gaelic footballer
 James Clarence Mangan (1803–1849), Irish poet
 James T. Mangan (1896–1970), author and eccentric
 Joseph Mangan, American aerospace engineer
 Josh Mangan (born 1986), Australian cricketer
 Kate Mangan (1904–1977), British artist, actress and journalist.
 Lou Mangan (1922–2015), Australian rules footballer 
 Lucy Mangan (born 1974), British journalist
 Luke Mangan (born 1970), Australian chef
 Mike Mangan (born 1975), American rugby union lock
 Mike Mangan (musician), American keyboard player
 Patricia Mangan (born 1997), American Olympic alpine skier
 Patrick Mangan (born 1959), British-Irish entrepreneur, Lord of Tangham, Knight of Rizal
 Sherry Mangan (1904–1961), American writer, journalist, translator, editor, and book designer
 Simon Mangan (died 1906), Lord Lieutenant of Meath (1894–1906)
 Stephen Mangan (born 1968), English actor
 Tom Mangan (1926-1998), American politician and educator
 Tony Mangan (born 1957), Irish ultra distance runner

Surnames of Irish origin